Ihaia Tainui (died 19 October 1885) was a Māori member of the New Zealand parliament.

He was the son of Wereta Tainui and grandson of Tuhuru Kokare, both chiefs of the Ngāi Tahu hapū (sub-tribe) Ngāti Waewae.

He represented the electorate of Southern Maori from 1879 (after Hōri Kerei Taiaroa was disqualified) to 1881, when he resigned and Hori Taiaroa resumed the electorate.

Tainui committed suicide by hanging on 19 October 1885 in the whare rūnanga at Arahura Pā, north of Hokitika.

References

1885 deaths
Members of the New Zealand House of Representatives
New Zealand MPs for Māori electorates
Ngāi Tahu people
New Zealand MPs for South Island electorates
Year of birth missing
Suicides by hanging in New Zealand
19th-century New Zealand politicians
New Zealand politicians who committed suicide
1880s suicides